Haslingden railway station served the town of Haslingden, Rossendale, Lancashire. The station was built by the East Lancashire Railway (ELR) on their Bury to  line and opened on 17 August 1848. 

In 1959, the ELR was incorporated into the Lancashire and Yorkshire Railway, who operated it until 1923 when it became part of the London Midland and Scottish Railway. Owned by the London Midland Region of British Railways from 1948, it was closed on 7 November 1960. The route through the station closed on 5 December 1966 and the tracks were subsequently lifted.

References
Lost Railways of Lancashire by Gordon Suggitt
The Directory of Railway Stations, R.V.J. Butt, 1995, Patrick Stephens, Yeovil,

Disused railway stations in the Borough of Rossendale
Former Lancashire and Yorkshire Railway stations
Railway stations in Great Britain opened in 1848
Railway stations in Great Britain closed in 1960